Church of the Good Shepherd is a historic Episcopal, rural family chapel at Cullen in Herkimer County, New York.  It was built in 1892 and consists of a rectangular nave with gable ends and a separate square tower connected by a hyphen.  The wood-frame structure with horizontal sheathing is on a foundation of rough cut stone.  It features Gothic details.  It was built by Dunham J. Crain for his family estate "Cullenwood."

It was listed on the National Register of Historic Places in 1997.

References

Baptist churches in New York (state)
Churches on the National Register of Historic Places in New York (state)
Gothic Revival church buildings in New York (state)
Churches completed in 1892
19th-century Episcopal church buildings
Churches in Herkimer County, New York
National Register of Historic Places in Herkimer County, New York